The Ubaye Valley is an area in the Alpes de Haute-Provence  département, in the French Alps, having approximately 7,700 residents. Its residents are called Ubayens. Its principal town is the sous-préfecture of Barcelonnette.

Ubaye River - Hydrography

The Ubaye River gives its name to the valley. The Ubaye rises on the Franco-Italian border, in Longet Lake, in the massif of Monte Viso. Its main tributary is the Ubayette River, which rise in the Lauzanier Lake.
 Ubaye Valley has many lakes :
 Terre-Plaine lake
 Neuf-Couleur Lake
 Sagnes Lake
 Lauzanier lake
 Lake Allos
 Petite Cayolle lake
 Mans lakes
 Longet lake
 Oronaye lake, near Longet lake
 Marinet Lake

Peaks

Ubaye Valley's highest mountain is the Aiguille de Chambeyron. The second one is the Brec de Chambeyron.

Towns
 Its two largest towns are Barcelonnette and Jausiers. From Low Valley to High Valley, near Ubaye the towns are: Le Lauzet-Ubaye, Les Thuiles (Lauzet's hamlet), Méolans-Revel, Barcelonnette, Faucon-de-Barcelonnette, Jausiers, La Condamine-Châtelard, Saint-Paul-sur-Ubaye and Tournoux.
 There are several ski stations:  Le Sauze, Pra-Loup (near Barcelonnette) and Sainte Anne (near La Condamine-Châtelard).
 Two small towns in the Ubayette valley: Meyronnes and Larche.

Access
There are only six passable vehicle roads during the summer: 
From the Haute-Provence (West) : "Pas-la-Tour" near Le Lauzet-Ubaye, open year-round
From the Verdon (South) : Col de la Cayolle and Col d'Allos (closed in winter)
From the Tinée (South) : Col de la Bonette at 2,750 meters, the highest road of Alps and the highest road in Europe (closed in winter)
From Stura Valley (Italy), (East): Pass of  Col de Larche (closed in winter)
From the Queyras (North) : Col de Vars (closed in winter).

History

 The Ubaye valley has been populated since prehistoric times.
 The Esubii, a Gaulish tribe, historically lived in the valley.
 It was incorporated into the Roman Empire by Augustus. A Roman road crossed the valley and the Romans occupied the Faucon-de-Barcelonnette's area.
 Christianized since the end of Roman Empire, Ubaye Valley belonged to the diocese of Embrun.
 The valley was in the county of Provence during the Middle Ages.
 Barcelonnette was founded in 1231 by Ramon Berenguer IV, Count of Provence.
 François Ier crossed the pass of Larche to attack Italy in the 16th century.
 Until the 1713 Treaty of Utrecht the valley was part of the Duchy of Savoy from its head to the confluence of the rivers Ubaye and Durance, and was the site of two Savoyard invasions of France in 1690 and 1692.
 The French Army of the Alps was based in Ubaye during the French Revolution.
 In the 1830s, the first real road to the valley was opened.
 During the 19th century and the start of the 20th, many of Ubaye's people emigrated to Mexico.
 Ubaye Valley was occupied by Italians in 1942, then by Germans in 1943 and 1944

Administration

The valley is in the arrondissement of Barcelonnette, and has two cantons.

Natural sites
 Lakes
 Mountains: L'Aiguille du Chambeyron, the Séolanes, Siguret, "la Tête de Louis XVI".
 The Mercantour National Park

Monuments
 Cardinalis Tower (Barcelonnette)
 Museum of Ubaye Valley (Barcelonnette)
 "Les Villas Mexicaines" (Barcelonnette and Jausiers)
 Church of Faucon-de-Barcelonnette.
 Church Saint Nicolas de Myre (Jausiers)
 Magnans's Castle (Jausiers)
 Abriès Mill (Jausiers)
 Cuguret stronghold. (Jausiers)
 Fort de Tournoux (La Condamine-Châtelard)

Notable residents
 Paul Reynaud, born in Barcelonnette
 The Brothers Arnaud, born in Jausiers
 Jacques-Antoine Manuel, born in Barcelonnette

Notes

External links
 Website of Ubaye Valley

Landforms of Alpes-de-Haute-Provence
Valleys of France
Landforms of Provence-Alpes-Côte d'Azur